Goodenia schwerinensis is a species of flowering plant in the family Goodeniaceae and is endemic to inland areas of Western Australia. It is a prostrate to low-lying herb with elliptic to lance-shaped leaves with toothed or lyrate edges, and racemes of yellow flowers.

Description

Taxonomy and naming
Goodenia schwerinensis was first formally described in 1980 by Roger Charles Carolin in the journal Telopea from material collected by David Eric Symon at the eastern end of the Schwerin Mural Crescent Range in 1962. The specific epithet (schwerinensis) refers to the type location.

Distribution and habitat
This goodenia grows in scrub and spinifex grassland in central eastern Western Australia.

Conservation status
Goodenia schwerinensis is classified as "not threatened" by the Government of Western Australia Department of Parks and Wildlife.

References

schwerinensis
Eudicots of Western Australia
Plants described in 1980
Taxa named by Roger Charles Carolin
Endemic flora of Australia